Galit Alter is an immunologist and virologist, professor of medicine at Harvard Medical School, and group leader at the Ragon Institute of MGH, MIT and Harvard. She is known for her work on the expansion of particular natural killer cell subtypes in response to HIV-1 infection. She has also contributed to the understanding of how SARS-CoV-2 antibody titers correlate with sustained humoral protection, including identifying coordinated immune cell-antibody signatures that may predict COVID-19 infection outcome.

References

Harvard Medical School faculty
Year of birth missing (living people)
American virologists
American immunologists
Living people
McGill University alumni
21st-century women scientists
Fellows of the American Academy of Microbiology